Erickson is an unincorporated urban community in the Municipality of Clanwilliam – Erickson within the Canadian province of Manitoba that held town status prior to 1 January 2015. It is located on Highway 10 on 32-17-18W in south central Manitoba. The main industry of Erickson is agriculture.

The community was originally established as a Canadian National railway point in 1905. When a post office was opened in 1908 it was known as Avesta. It was named after a town in south-central Sweden. Shortly after, the post office was moved near the railway station site which was named Erickson Station. The station had been named after the Postmaster, E. Albert Erickson.

Demographics 

References

External links
 Municipality of Clanwilliam – Erickson website

Designated places in Manitoba
Former towns in Manitoba
Populated places disestablished in 2015
2015 disestablishments in Manitoba